The Ministry of Social Development, Assistance, Family and Fight against Hunger (MSD) (MDS) is a cabinet-level federal ministry in Brazil.

History 
The ministry was established in 2004 from the merger of the Special Ministry of Food and Nutritional Security, the Ministry of Social Assistance, and the Executive Secretariat of the Inter-ministerial Manager Council of Bolsa Família. It administers Bolsa Família, the National Social Assistance Fund (SANF), Industry Social Service (SESI), Commerce Social Service (SESC), and Transport Social Service (SEST)..

Under the Presidency of Jair Bolsonaro, the ministry was incorporated into the Ministry of Citizenship, together with the Ministry of Sports and Ministry of Culture.

List of Ministers 
Below is a list of Ministers of Social Development and Fight against Hunger.

References

External links
 Official site 

Government ministries of Brazil